Joris Hendricus Laarman (born October 24, 1979) is a Dutch designer, artist and entrepreneur best known for his experimental designs inspired by emerging technologies.

Biography

Laarman was born in Borculo, Netherlands. He graduated cum laude from the Design Academy Eindhoven in 2003.
Laarman first received international recognition for his "Heatwave radiator"  produced by the Dutch design brand Droog and later manufactured by Jaga Climate Systems. Heatwave radiator is now on public display at the High Museum of Art in Atlanta, Georgia, USA.

In 2004, Laarman together with his partner Anita Star, founded Joris Laarman Lab in Amsterdam, Netherlands. The lab collaborates with craftsmen, scientists and engineers and the possibilities of emerging technologies as CNC systems, 3D printing, robotics or simulation software.

Laarman's designs are in the permanent collections and exhibitions in such institutions as MoMA, New York City;  V&A, London; Centre Pompidou, Paris. The Bonechair and its prototype were recently added as the closing works of the 20th century collection of the Rijksmuseum, Amsterdam.

He has contributed to articles and seminars for Domus Magazine and has lectured at the Architectural Association School of Architecture, London, the Gerrit Rietveld Academy, Amsterdam and the Design Academy Eindhoven.

In 2013, the Lab collaborated with Greenpeace installing a time capsule at the bottom of the arctic sea for the Save the Arctic campaign.

Selected works
MX3D Bridge, 2021
Digital Matter, 2011
Half Life, 2010
Cumulus, 2010
Nebula, 2007
Bone Furniture, 2006
Heatwave Radiator, 2003

Awards

2011: Wall Street Journal, Innovator of the year Award
2008: International Elle Decoration, Designer of the year
2006: Red Dot Design Award
2004: Wallpaper magazine, Young designer of the year
2004: The International Furniture Fair, IMM, Interior Innovation Award
2004: Red Dot Design Award

Exhibitions

2017 Gwanju Design Biennale, Gwanju City, Korea 
2017 Minding the Digital, Design Society, Shenzhen, China 
2017 Joris Laarman Lab, Cooper Hewitt, Smithsonian Design Museum, New York, USA 
2017 Hello, Robot. Design between Human and Machine, Vitra Design Museum, Weil am Rhein, DE 
2018 Joris Laarman Lab, High Museum of Art, Atlanta, USA
2018 Joris Laarman Lab, Museum of Fine Arts (MFA), Houston, USA 
2018 Solo Exhibition, Kukje Gallery, Seoul, Korea 
2019 La Fabrique du Vivant, Centre Pompidou, Paris, France 
2023 Mirror Mirror: Reflections on Design at Chatsworth at Chatsworth House, UK

References

External links
 
Friedman Benda's website
Centre Georges Pompidou, Paris, Online collection http://www.centrepompidou.fr/cpv/rechercher.action
Museum of Modern Art, New York, Online collection http://www.moma.org/collection/artist.php?artist_id=33034

1979 births
Living people
Dutch designers
Dutch artists
People from Berkelland